Madurai East is a legislative assembly constituency in the Indian state of Tamil Nadu. Elections and Winners from this constituency are listed below. Madurai East will be one of 17 assembly constituencies to have VVPAT facility with EVMs in 2016 Tamil Nadu Legislative Assembly election. It is one of the 234 State Legislative Assembly Constituencies in Tamil Nadu in India.

Madras State

Tamil Nadu

Election results

2021

2016

2011

2006

2001

1996

1991

1989

1984

1980

1977

1971

1967

1962

References 

 

Assembly constituencies of Tamil Nadu
Madurai
Politics of Madurai
Government of Madurai